Westlake is an industrial city in Calcasieu Parish, in western Louisiana, United States, and is part of the Lake Charles metropolitan statistical area. The population was 4,781 in 2020. Westlake was incorporated in 1945. There are many chemical plants and oil refineries situated around the Westlake area.

Geography 
Westlake is located in east-central Calcasieu Parish at  (30.248455, -93.259047), on the west bank of the Calcasieu River, just north of that river's entry into the water body of Lake Charles. The city of Lake Charles borders Westlake across the river, connected via the Interstate 10 bridge.

Moss Bluff is just to the northeast. Sulphur is to the west, after the small community of Mossville.

Demographics 

As of the 2020 United States census, there were 4,781 people, 1,935 households, and 1,178 families residing in the city.

Government
Westlake uses a city council consisting of five council members. As of April 2020, the current mayor of Westlake is Robert "Bob" Hardey.

Notable people 
 Stephen Dwight, Calcasieu Parish District Attorney.
 David LaFleur, professional American football player. He started as a tight end at Louisiana State University and later played for the Dallas Cowboys.
 Joshua Ledet earned third place on American Idol season 11 and is a native of Westlake.

Education 
Public schools in the town are operated by the Calcasieu Parish Public School System.

Elementary schools: 
Westwood Elementary School
Western Heights Elementary School.

Middle school:
S. P. Arnett Middle School

High school:
Westlake High School

List of mayors 
 1945 - 1950 Gus Warren Anderson
 1950 - 1954 John Warren (Jack) Grout
 1954 - 1957 Gus Warren Anderson (2.)
 1957 - 1974 Charles M. Carroll
 1974 - 1982 Wilridge P. Doucet
 1982 - 2006 Dudley Dixon
 2007–2014 Daniel Cupit
 2015–2022 Robert "Bob" Hardey
2022-2023 Dan Racca (Pro-Tem)
2023-Present Hal McMillin

References

External links 
 

Populated places established in 1945
Cities in Louisiana
Cities in Calcasieu Parish, Louisiana
Cities in Lake Charles metropolitan area